Gana (Gana, Ganaq) is an Austronesian language of Sabah, Malaysia.

Since Gana and Kujau, a Dusunic language, are both spoken in and around Keningau town, Gana has a significant proportion of Dusunic loanwords, although it is originally a Murutic language.

References

Murutic languages
Endangered Austronesian languages
Languages of Malaysia